Sibrand (also Siebrandt, Siebrant, Siebrand, Sibrandt, Sigbrand, Siegbrand, Siegbrandt, shortened to Sibern, Sibbern, Sibo) is a Low German or Frisian name current in Northern Germany (Frisia, Pommerania).
It is from an earlier *Sigibrant,  composed of the elements sig "victory" and brand "sword".
It is also attested as a surname from the 16th century.

People called Sibrand:
Given name
 Master Sibrand (fl. 1190), crusader
 Sibrand Lubbert (d. 1625), theologian
Surname
Johann Sibrand (1637–1701)
Hermann Sibrand  (1645–1712), academic and mayor of Stettin
Joachim Heinrich Sibrand (1670–1743), legal scholar

Surnames of German origin